Zuleyma Cirimele (born 26 May 1967) is a Venezuelan softball player. She competed in the women's tournament at the 2008 Summer Olympics.

References

External links
 

1967 births
Living people
Venezuelan softball players
Olympic softball players of Venezuela
Softball players at the 2008 Summer Olympics
Sportspeople from Maracay
20th-century Venezuelan women
21st-century Venezuelan women